Katarína Roth Neveďalová (born 10 November 1982) is a Slovak politician from Direction – Slovak Social Democracy. 

Between 2009 and 2014 she was a Member of the European Parliament, where she was a member of the Progressive Alliance of Socialists and Democrats (S&D). She became Vice-President of the Party of European Socialists in 2012.

She returned to the European Parliament in 2022 after the death of Miroslav Číž.

References

See also 

 List of members of the European Parliament for Slovakia, 2019–2024

1982 births
Living people
Politicians from Nitra
Women MEPs for Slovakia
21st-century Slovak politicians
21st-century Slovak women politicians
MEPs for Slovakia 2009–2014
MEPs for Slovakia 2019–2024
Direction – Social Democracy MEPs
Direction – Social Democracy politicians